The Civil Commissioner of Malta was an official who ruled Malta during the French blockade and later the British protectorate period between 1799 and 1813. Upon the end of the Protectorate and the creation of the Crown Colony of Malta in 1813, this office was replaced by that of the governor, who represented the Government of the United Kingdom.

List of civil commissioners (1799–1813)

See also
List of Governors of Malta
Governor-General of Malta

References

.xCivil Commissioners
Malta, Civil Commissioners
Civil commissioners
Malta
Civil Commissioner
18th century in Malta
19th century in Malta
Malta–United Kingdom relations